The Beauty of the Rain is the fifth studio album by Dar Williams.

Track listing
All songs written by Dar Williams, except where noted.
"Mercy of the Fallen" – 4:11
"Farewell to the Old Me" – 2:45
"I Saw a Bird Fly Away" – 2:51
"The Beauty of the Rain" – 3:00
"The World's Not Falling Apart" – 4:24
"The One Who Knows" – 3:47
"Closer to Me" (Williams, Rob Hyman) – 3:42
"Fishing in the Morning" – 2:38
"Whispering Pines" (Richard Manuel, Robbie Robertson) – 4:00
"Your Fire Your Soul" – 3:04
"I Have Lost My Dreams" – 3:05

Personnel
Dar Williams – guitar, vocals
Eric Bazilian – guitar, mandolin
Chris Botti – trumpet
Cliff Eberhardt – vocals
Béla Fleck – banjo
Steve Holley – drums
Rob Hyman – piano, Hammond organ, production, Wurlitzer, melodica, keyboards, Reed organ
Stewart Lerman – bass guitar, guitar, keyboards, engineering, production
Michael Kang – violin
Alison Krauss – vocals
Stefan Lessard – bass guitar
David Mansfield – violin
John Medeski – piano, clavinet, Hammond organ
Sammy Merendino – drums
John Popper – harmonica, vocals
Steuart Smith – guitar, 12-string guitar, e-bow, piano, Hammond organ, harmonica
Paul Sokolow – bass guitar
Carol Steele – percussion
William Wittman – bass guitar, engineering, mixing

2003 albums
Dar Williams albums
Razor & Tie albums
Albums produced by Rob Hyman
Albums produced by Stewart Lerman